The Wawel Chakra (Polish: czakram wawelski) - a place on Wawel hill in Kraków in Poland which is believed to emanate powerful spiritual energy.
Adherents believe it to be one of the world's main centers of spiritual energy

.
The Wawel Chakra is said to be one of a few select places of immense power on Earth, which, like a chakra point in the human body, allegedly functions as part of an (esoteric) energetic system within Earth.

According to believers, the center of the Wawel Chakra is situated under St. Gereon's chapel, which was built in the 11th century and is located between the Royal Castle and the Wawel Cathedral - in the north-west corner of Wawel's courtyard.

The Wawel Chakra, or Wawel Stone, or Wawel Lotus or Wawel Power Place is treated as:
 a theosophical belief from 1930s (with legendary threads)
 a contemporary legend (so called urban legend) from the 1980s (but with roots in 1930s)
 a place of great interest and a research subject (and speculated topic) of contemporary dowsers and geomants
 a place of powerful spiritual and healing energy for New Agers
 a nuisance for people of firm Catholic or scientific background
 a tourist attraction, not welcomed by church and museum authorities

The Wawel Chakra as an urban legend 

One of Wawel's most well-known, but officially unendorsed legends is that of the fabled chakra stone.
The chakra stone is believed to be a holy stone, protecting the hill upon which Wawel was built, and thus protecting the whole city of Kraków as well. It is one of seven mysterious energy sources located in different places around the world - these sources are also regarded as the seven main energy centres of Earth.

There is an assumption that the Earth has seven special places quite like ‘force centers’ of the human body called chakras in the tantric and yogic teachings of Hinduism. Kraków, and specifically the Wawel hill, is supposed to be one of those force centers or 'holy areas'. Additionally, Rome, Jerusalem, and Delhi are usually awarded the same status, however, there has been no consensus giving them official status. An internet search yields about 40 locations claiming to be one of the seven chakras of Earth.

The origins of the tale have been traced to a newspaper story published in the mid-1930s. It reported that two mysterious gentlemen from India visited the Wawel Castle and were overly interested in an empty corner of the courtyard, which prompted guesswork. The story resurfaced in the 1980s. Soon, the Wawel Chakra would become famous in Kraków and in Poland as a whole, its legend fanned by New Age enthusiasts. In the 21st century, it began to wane. Recently, authorities such as the Wawel museum management as well as Catholic Church have engaged in battling the chakram fallacy which may breathe new life into it.

The Wawel Chakra as Theosophical occult center 
According to European theosophical tradition, there are seven chakras of Earth, the other six being located in New Delhi, Mekka, Delphi, Rome, Velehrad. In Hindu tradition, there are also chakras in Benares, Hardwar, Rishikesh, Allahabad.

According to a legend, Greek philosopher, mystic, and explorer, Apollonius of Tyana, discovered a hill during one of his long-term voyages, now called Wawel, which emitted great, positive radiation. He left there one of his talismans to reveal the full potential of chakra radiation.

However, it probably was Wanda Dynowska, a Polish theosophist and translator, who bonded Wawel with an old Hindu legend. The legend tells that God Shiva threw seven stones in seven directions towards Earth, as a gift to the people, spawning seven places that emit the god's powerful energy.

Annie Besant and Charles Leadbeater visited Wawel, stating that they felt a powerful spiritual energy. George Arundale wrote in 1932 about the powerful magnetic aura of Wawel.

Polish theosophist, Kazimierz Chodkiewicz wrote a book The Cracow Occult Centre.

New Agers and the Wawel Chakra 

Although St. Gereon's chapel is not open to the public, single people engrossed in meditation can still be found - all year around, standing or sitting near the north-west corner of Wawel's courtyard. Believers may also touch a chapel wall with their heads, backs, hands or heels – this is the wall which screens St. Gereon's chapel from the eyes of the public.

It became customary for people who believe in the power of the chakra to come here and lean against the wall for a few minutes in order to recharge their spiritual batteries.

Researches and speculations of geomants and dowsers 
According to geomants, dowsers and psychics, there is no doubt about the powerful, positive energy radiating out of the place called Czakram Wawelski.

There is no consensus on the existence of the stone, however. The stone may be a:
 pure legend
 metaphor 
 metaphorical source of positive terrestrial radiation
 metaphorical source of spiritual forces
 literal stone - maybe a precious stone or a piece of meteorite which had been forged into an amulet in order to strengthen and streamline the radiation of this place of power. It may have been intentionally placed in a rock crack on Wawel Hill (by Apollonius of Tyana, if the story is true).

According to Polish geomant and dowser Leszek Matela, there is unusual radiation there, both cosmic and terrestrial, emanated by subterrainian water veins ascending towards the chapel.
The water veins flow deeply underground in the bedrock, lifting up beneath the chapel. Consequently, the annular radiation occurs. The radiation is beneficial to human beings, unlike the radiation of usual water veins.

Additionally, this powerful radiation is intensified by the global Hartmann Grid and the diagonal Curry Grid. These two cosmic radiation networks distribute and intensify both earth and cosmic radiation, either negative (of water veins etc.) or positive of places of power.

As many as seven ley lines cross at Wawel. They link Wawel to many other places of power, including Stonehenge, Jerusalem, Stara Zagora, Istanbul, Arkona, Rome, Vilnius.

More research, statements, and speculations 
There is no simple analogy between human chakras and the chakras of the earth. There are more than seven Earth chakras, and they are nodes of Earth's subtle radiation network and subtle energy transformers.
Perhaps – if the hypothesis of Goncharov, Makarov and Morozov is true - Earth chakras are active nodes of Earth global crystal-like structure

The Wawel Chakra is a left-handed one, which means that its main purpose is to absorb negative energy and cleanse energy aura this part of Earth.

The power of Cracow Chakra's stone geomantic energy has been estimated by Polish geomant Leszek Matela and is 120.000 points on BSM scale (Bovis-Simenoton-Matela) – for comparison, radiation of a healthy human body is ‘just’ 6500 points.

The Cracow chakra reached its full power in 1935, on the day of the funeral of Marshall Jozef Pilsudski. According to reports from the event, extraordinary things happened then – suddenly air temperature dropped by 7 Celsius degrees and about 14 o'clock a darkness overcame the area.

The oldest legends tell about the dragon of Wawel Hill, which lived in a cave under Wawel on the bank of the Vistula river. In eastern traditions, dragons were great guards of power places, especially those connected to the energy of Earth. So perhaps the legend about the dragon refers also to Wawel Chakra.

The Wawel Chakra as an unwanted tourist attraction 

The specific location of the positive energy is not open to the public in spite of the archeological excavation there having been completed.

When the chakra area was roped off in 2001, the conservationists' desire to protect the wall from the public was explained as the main reason for this.

Works cited 
 Matela, Leszek (2006). Tajemnice czakramu wawelskiego i sekrety Krakowa (Secrets of the Wawel Chakra and Mysteries of Cracow). Białystok. 
 Święch, Zbigniew (2005). Czakram wawelski. Największa tajemnica wzgórza (The Wawel Chakra. The Biggest Secret of the Hill). Kraków. 
 Rożek, Michał (1991). Kraków, czyli siódmy czakram ziemi. O tajemniczych osobliwościach tego miasta (Cracow, or the Seventh Chakra of the Earth. About Mysterious Peculiarities of the Town). Kraków. 
Chodkiewicz, Kazimierz (1966). The Cracow Occult Center. London. "The most important 20th century voice on the extraordinary powers of Wawel"
 Italian edition: Il centro occulto di Cracovia, Torino 1975
 Polish edition: Kraków: ognisko sił tajemnych - duchowy ośrodek mocy, Kraków 1992 (reprinted in Święch Z.(2005), pp. 75–97)

References 

Polish legends
Chakras
Wawel
Earth mysteries